Long John Baldry Trio Live was an album released by Long John Baldry in 2000.

It was recorded on September 21, 1999 in the "Down Town Blues Club" in Hamburg, Germany.

Track listing
 "Good Morning Blues" - 5:28
 "Who Back Buck" - 2:40
 "Back Water Blues" - 7:47
 "Morning Dew" - 4:14
 "Black Girl" - 3:22
 "It Ain't Easy" - 4:17
 "Burn Down the Cornfield" - 5:58
 "Moon Dance in Tajikistan" - 4:15
 "Walk On" - 5:54
 "Can't Keep from Crying Some Time" - 2:22
 "Maggie Bell" - 3:33
 "Blue Valentine" - 5:55
 "Midnight in New Orleans" - 4:32
 "Flying" - 6:05

Personnel
Long John Baldry - Vocals and 12 string guitar
Matt Taylor - Electric and acoustic guitar, vocals
Butch Coulter - Harmonica and acoustic guitar

Long John Baldry albums
2000 live albums